Allison Herren Lee is an American attorney and former government official who served as a member of the Securities and Exchange Commission (SEC) from 2019 to 2022.

A member of the Democratic Party, Lee briefly served as acting chair of the SEC from January to April 2021. After leaving the SEC, Lee became an adjunct professor at the New York University (NYU) School of Law.

Education 
Lee received a degree in business from the University of Colorado, Boulder and a J.D. degree from the University of Denver College of Law. During her time at law school, Lee was salutatorian, a chancellor’s Scholar, and served on the school's Law Review.

Career 
Prior to joining the SEC, Lee worked in private practice as a partner at Sherman & Howard LLC. She also served as a Special Assistant U.S. Attorney and was a member of the American Bar Association’s former Committee on Public Company Disclosure.

U.S. Securities and Exchange Commission 
In 2005, Lee joined the agency as a staff attorney at the SEC's enforcement division at a regional office in Denver, Colorado. Before being appointed as a commissioner, Lee served in various roles at the SEC for over a decade, including as counsel to Commissioner Kara Stein, and as senior counsel in the Division of Enforcement’s Complex Financial Instruments Unit.

Tenure 
Lee was confirmed by the United States Senate in June 2019 to fill a Democratic vacancy on the SEC. She announced her departure from the agency in 2022, and Democrat Jaime Lizárraga was confirmed as her successor on the SEC.{cn}}

ESG issues 
During her tenure, Lee was credited with bringing environmental, social, and corporate governance (ESG) issues to the forefront of the agency's agenda. As a commissioner, Lee hired a policy advisor focused on ESG issues and initiated a commission task force to clamp down on alleged "greenwashing". During her time as acting SEC chair, Lee helped craft rules that directed the SEC to gather public input on corporate climate change disclosures.

Post-SEC career 
In 2022, it was announced that Lee would join the New York University School of Law as an adjunct professor and senior fellow at the school's Institute for Corporate Governance and Finance.

References 

Living people
Year of birth missing (living people)
Place of birth missing (living people)
21st-century American women lawyers
21st-century American lawyers
Assistant United States Attorneys
Colorado Democrats
U.S. Securities and Exchange Commission personnel
University of Colorado Boulder alumni
University of Denver alumni

New York University School of Law faculty
Sturm College of Law alumni